Glumdalclitch is the name Gulliver gives his "nurse" in Book II of Jonathan Swift's 1726 novel Gulliver's Travels. In Book I, Gulliver travels to the land of Lilliput. Leaving there, he travels to the land of Brobdingnag. In Lilliput, Gulliver was a giant, and in Brobdingnag, he is a dwarf, with the proportions reversed.

Fictional biography 
When he comes ashore, he is captured by a giant farmer, who perceives Gulliver only as an animal, a freak of nature resembling a man-shaped mouse. He takes Gulliver home and gives him to his nine-year-old daughter, a child "not above forty feet high, being little for her age."  She makes Gulliver her pet, creates a small travel case for him (a miniature bed-chamber in a box), and is amused to play with him as if he were a doll. Gulliver grows very fond of the girl, and gives her the pet name of Glumdalclitch, or "little nurse" in the Brobdingnagian language. (Of course "little" is ironic in the circumstances. If Gulliver knows her real name, he does not tell the reader.) Glumdalclitch is a skilled seamstress with a talent for making dolls' clothes. Although Gulliver admires the wardrobe that she makes for him, he finds that even the finest Brobdingnagian fabric is coarse and irritates his skin. The farmer takes Gulliver about as a freak show, charging observers money for performances. Gulliver grows very proud of the stunts that he performs for Glumdalclitch's amusement.

When the Queen of Brobdingnag takes Gulliver into her court, he has Glumdalclitch brought to court with him. The prideful Gulliver thinks of himself as being greatly honored and promoted by moving to court, but never ceases to love and seek the approval of the little girl who first helped him. Indeed, he remembers her fondly even after returning to England.

While Book I is narrowly allegorical, Book II of Gulliver's Travels is less a roman a clef than a political and philosophical discussion. While Glumdalclitch could represent Swift's memories of the young Stella from his time living with William Temple at Moor Park, Surrey, she probably does not stand in for any real-life person.

If one does take Glumdalclitch as the young Stella and the episode as an encoding of the time at Moor Park, then it is a poignant story. Swift, like Gulliver, delighted in performing for Stella (e.g. his Meditation Upon a Broomstick, which he wrote for her), was shown about by her "father" (William Temple), found the living too coarse for his sensibilities, left her company for a "promotion" to London and court life, and mourned her absence for the rest of his life.

In popular culture
In television and film adaptations, the character has been played by Sherry Alberoni, Ági Szirtes, and Kate Maberly, and voiced by Janet Waldo. The character was reimagined in the 2010 film adaptation (in a non-speaking role) as a child and treats Gulliver as a baby doll, presumably to keep with the comedy themes.
It was a family nickname for the novelist Jane Octavia Brookfield.
Glumdalclitch is the subject of an eponymous novel by Leo Sonderegger published in 2000 as a sequel to Gulliver's Travels, where she is named "Wendeling".

References

Characters in British novels of the 18th century
Fictional giants
Gulliver's Travels
Female characters in literature
Child characters in literature
Literary characters introduced in 1726